Answers is the 25th album by jazz fusion group Casiopea released in 1994.

Track listing

Personnel 
CASIOPEA are
Issei Noro - Guitars
Minoru Mukaiya - keyboards
Yoshihiro Naruse - Bass
Noriaki Kumagai - drums

Guest 
 Michael R. Muldoon - Percussion

Production 
 Sound Produced  —  CASIOPEA
 Executive Producer  —  Yoshiaki Mizutani

Recording & Mixing Engineer  —  Ross Cockle
 Assistant Engineer  —  Porter Miller
 Mastering Engineer  —  Tohru Kotetsu

 Instruments Technician  —  Yasushi Horiuchi, Eisuke Sasaki
 Basses Build Up Technician  —  Yoshiki Murayama

 Art Direction & Design  —  Shigekazu Tsujimori
 CG Art & Design  —  Keiko Akiyama
 Photograph  —  Junichi Takahashi, PHOTONICA, MON-TRÉSOR

Remastering engineer  —  Kouji Suzuki (2016)

Release history

External links 
 Audio Resource Honolulu Home Page

References 

1994 albums
Casiopea albums
Alfa Records albums